The nerve to quadratus femoris is a nerve that provides innervation to the quadratus femoris muscle and gemellus inferior muscle.

Structure
The nerve to quadratus femoris is a sacral plexus nerve. It arises from the ventral divisions of the fourth lumbar spinal nerve, fifth lumbar spinal nerve, and first sacral spinal nerve. It leaves the pelvis through the greater sciatic foramen, below piriformis muscle. It runs down in front of the sciatic nerve, the superior and inferior gemellus muscles, and the tendon of the obturator internus. It enters the anterior surfaces of quadratus femoris muscle and gemellus inferior muscle. It gives an articular branch to the hip joint.

Variation 
Rarely, the nerve to quadratus femoris may also innervate the gemellus superior muscle, or the upper part of adductor magnus muscle.

Function 
The nerve to quadratus femoris provides motor innervation to quadratus femoris muscle and inferior gemellus muscle. It also provides sensory innervation to the hip joint.

References 

Nerves of the lower limb and lower torso